Ihlen can refer to:

Ihlen, Minnesota, a city in Pipestone County, Minnesota, United States
Nils Claus Ihlen, Norwegian diplomat
German exonym for the village Īle, Latvia
Archaic name for Ila, Norway, site of Ila Prison